Bernartice is name of several locations in the Czech Republic:

Bernartice (Benešov District), a municipality and village in the Central Bohemian Region
Bernartice (Jeseník District), a municipality and village in the Olomouc Region
Bernartice (Písek District), a market town in the South Bohemian Region
Bernartice (Trutnov District), a municipality and village in the Hradec Králové Region
Bernartice nad Odrou, a municipality and village in the Moravian-Silesian Region